The Louisiana Tech Bulldogs football program has had 76 players drafted into the National Football League (NFL) since the league began holding drafts in 1936. This includes five players taken in the first round and one overall number one pick, Terry Bradshaw in 1970. Louisiana Tech had one player selected in the most recent NFL Draft.

Each NFL franchise seeks to add new players through the annual NFL Draft. The draft rules were last updated in 2009. The team with the worst record the previous year picks first, the next-worst team second, and so on. Teams that did not make the playoffs are ordered by their regular-season record with any remaining ties broken by strength of schedule. Playoff participants are sequenced after non-playoff teams, based on their round of elimination (wild card, division, conference, and Super Bowl).

Before the merger agreements in 1966, the American Football League (AFL) operated in direct competition with the NFL and held a separate draft. This led to a massive bidding war over top prospects between the two leagues. As part of the merger agreement on June 8, 1966, the two leagues would hold a multiple round "Common Draft". Once the AFL officially merged with the NFL in 1970, the "Common Draft" simply became the NFL Draft.



Key

Selections

Notes

References
General

Specific

 
Louisiana Tech
Louisiana Tech Bulldogs NFL Draft